William Robert Laughlin (July 5, 1932 – August 31, 1948) was an American child actor. He is best known for playing the character Froggy in the Our Gang short films in its final stretch, from 1940 to 1944.

Early life
Laughlin was born on July 5, 1932 in San Gabriel, California, to Robert Vine Laughlin (August 28, 1901 – September 30, 1972) and Charlotte C. Cruikshank (March 11, 1903 – June 4, 1992). According to Our Gang actor Robert Blake, Laughlin was "dearly loved".

Career
Laughlin rose to fame at the age of eight when he appeared in his first Our Gang film, The New Pupil, in 1940. He worked in support of Alfalfa Switzer in his first three films and then replaced the now too old Switzer as the comic lead of the group with the 1941 films. His character was known for his strange, guttural voice, which was reminiscent of a frog's croak. Laughlin's last Our Gang short film was the last film of the series in 1944 called Dancing Romeo.  Laughlin did the voice himself without dubbing, basing it on a Popeye impersonation he had been doing for friends.

When Our Gang stopped production in 1944, Laughlin appeared in a cameo in Monogram's Johnny Doesn't Live Here Any More, his only non Our Gang film, speaking in his natural voice for the only time ever on film.

Death
Laughlin died at a hospital on August 31, 1948 after a speeding truck struck the Cushman motor scooter on which he was delivering newspapers near his home in La Puente, California. The 16-year-old friend who was operating the scooter, John Wilband, made a U-turn in front of the truck, but survived with minor injuries. The scooter was given to Laughlin by his parents two weeks prior to the accident. Only 16, Laughlin died younger than any of the other actors who appeared in the Our Gang films. Laughlin is interred in a grave at the Rose Hills Memorial Park Cemetery in Whittier, California next to his parents.

References

External links

 

American male child actors
Male actors from California
Road incident deaths in California
1932 births
1948 deaths
People from San Gabriel, California
20th-century American male actors
Burials at Rose Hills Memorial Park
American male comedy actors
Our Gang